Joseph Culmone (May 13, 1931 – July 23, 1996) was an American Champion jockey. in the sport of Thoroughbred horse racing. 

Joe Culmone was born in Delia, Sicily, where he lived in a farming area and learned to ride horses. His mother died during World War II and in 1946 he emigrated to the United States to join his father in Atlantic City, New Jersey. He began working as a stable hand and exercise rider at the Atlantic City Race Course and embarked on his jockey career at Florida's Tropical Park Race Track in late 1948.  A year later he was meeting with great success as an apprentice rider, scoring back-to-back triple wins on racecards at Tropical Park in December 1949.  In 1950 Culmone tied the great Bill Shoemaker for the most wins of any jockey in the United States with 388, a total that equaled a forty-four-year-old world record set by Walter Miller in 1906.

Culmone worked as a contract rider for the famous Brookmeade Stable and also rode for noted owners such as Calumet Farm and Harry Z. Isaacs. During his career, he competed  primarily at racetracks from New York along the Eastern Seaboard to Florida and at Oriental Park Racetrack in Cuba. He rode five winners on a single racecard several times and on November 27, 1950 won six races on a single card at Bowie Race Track.  In the U.S. Triple Crown series, Culmone had five rides in the Preakness Stakes with his best finish a sixth in 1957 and again in 1964.

Retired from racing in 1972, Joe Culmone died in 1996 at age 65 at his home in Cherry Hill, New Jersey.

References

Sources
December 15, 1949 Miami News article on jockey Joe Culmone
Obituary for Joseph Culmone at The Press of Atlantic City

1931 births
1996 deaths
American Champion jockeys
People from Cherry Hill, New Jersey
Sportspeople from the Province of Caltanissetta
Italian emigrants to the United States